¡Mucha Lucha! (subtitled Gigante during its third and final season) is an American animated television series that premiered on Kids' WB, Teletoon, and Canal 5 from August 17, 2002, to February 26, 2005. It was created by Eddie Mort and Lili Chin and produced by Warner Bros. Animation. It is the first animated television series intended for children created with Adobe Flash, a program which became widely used as a medium for animation in the years.

On January 4, 2005, the direct-to-video feature film ¡Mucha Lucha!: The Return of El Maléfico was based on the series.

Premise
The show is set in Luchaville, a fictional town in Southern California centered on lucha libre where nearly everyone in that town wears a costume (they are never seen without their mask) and has a well-known wrestling move. The series mainly centers on three friends, Rikochet, Buena Girl, and the Flea, as they struggle through the Foremost World-Renowned International School of Lucha, where they study.

Episodes

Characters

 Rikochet (voiced by Carlos Alazraqui and Jason Marsden)– A young wrestler who is the protagonist. He considers himself the bravest of the group, but sometimes leaps before he finds.
 Buena Girl (Kimberly Brooks)– A smart, young female wrestler who always plays by the rules. She can also be very arrogant and obnoxious at times.
 The Flea (voiced by Candi Milo)– A friend of Rikochet and Buena Girl who is always dirty and refers to himself in the third person. As well as having a few disgusting habits, he is also the most nervous but often proves to be a useful ally.
 El Rey (voiced by Michael Donovan)–  An action figure which represents Rikochet's conscience. He carries him in a backpack, but he can move and talk on his own as if he were alive. It is stated that this action figure is just part of a large merchandising euphoria related to a supreme undefeated Mexican wrestler with the same name (an allusion to Santo). Alongside the series, several other El Rey toys appear and often causes trouble with Rikochet.

Production
¡Mucha Lucha! was the brainchild of Eddie Mort and Lili Chin for Kids' WB. Mort began his animation career working for Disney Television Animation in Sydney before leaving to work at Nickelodeon in Australia, where he animated several shorts for the network, including the Adventures of Hot Chunks and Snout. Lili Chin worked as an assistant animator on The Silver Brumby, and as a clean-up artist for Skippy: Adventures in Bushtown. Chin and Mort launched Fwak! Animation, a Sydney-based animation studio, in 2000. Through Fwak!, Mort and Chin made the short Lucha School in 2001, which featured a fourth character that never made it into the series "Psiclone". Lucha School would then be pitched to Warner Bros. Animation and Bardel Entertainment in the early 2000s. Bardel Entertainment would later produce the animation for shows like Teen Titans Go! and Rick and Morty. The pitch was a success, and Kids' WB gave the show the green light afterwards.

It was often regarded as one of the first fully-made flash cartoons produced for television. However, it is not the first flash animated television series in general; as that honor went to the 2001 short-lived television series John Callahan's Quads!, which was exclusive to Teletoon and the Special Broadcasting Service. The second flash television series was Max & Ruby, another Canadian animated series. However, ¡Mucha Lucha! was still considered the first fully-made flash animated series for American television, and was also the first truly successful flash television series. During production, the entire series was produced in widescreen. However, it was aired with an SD format. The widescreen version was never released to the public until it became available for streaming.

Several show creators did end up working on the show before moving on to other projects, including Ciro Nieli, who would later create Super Robot Monkey Team Hyperforce Go! and Teenage Mutant Ninja Turtles (2012), as well as Julie McNally-Cahill and Timothy Cahill, who later created My Gym Partner's a Monkey and Littlest Pet Shop (2012), as well as Sandra Equihua and Jorge R. Gutierrez, who later created El Tigre: The Adventures of Manny Rivera. By season 2, the series marked Peter Hastings' return to Warner Bros.

During the first season, ¡Mucha Lucha! would provide morals at the beginning of episodes through title cards. Rikochet, Buena Girl, and the Flea would give viewers statements on what a true luchador would do. For example, Rikochet gives a true luchador statement in the first episode "Back to School", and the statement goes like this: "A True Luchador knows the only thing to fear is fear itself. Oh, and bullies." These statements were not shown in the following seasons.

Music

Original music score
The theme song was performed by Chicos de Barrio, with a remixed version done by Mambotron for season 3.

During its first two seasons, the show also features music by Michael Tavera, who previously made music for Cartoon Network's Time Squad, and would later make music for shows such as Lilo & Stitch: The Series, Yin Yang Yo!, and The Secret Saturdays.

By season 3, under Gigante, Tavera would not have any involvement, as he was replaced with Mambotron for the music, consisting of Nicolas Barry, Tomas Jacobi, Rene Garza Aldape, and Chuy Flores.

Licensed music
The show also featured some licensed songs. All of which, along with the show's theme song. would be released as part of the show's official soundtrack.

Café Quijano - Desde Brasil
Los Miserables - Punk Rock Y Subversion
Celso Piña - Cumbia Poder
Tito Nieves - Shut Up
Frankie Negron - So Wonderful
Plastiko - Esfera De Cristal
Pesado - Entre Mi Corazón Tu Y Yo
El Tri - Nosotros Los Latinos
SNZ - Me Protejo
Bacilos - Bésela Ya
Charlie Cruz - Un Chin Chin
Volumen Cero - Hollywood

Broadcast
The show was also seen on Kids' WB in the United States, Teletoon in Canada, Kix in the United Kingdom, and Canal 5 in Mexico from August 17, 2002, until February 26, 2005. It also premiered on Cartoon Network internationally in 2003, and in U.S in 2004. In March 2007, the show began its first rerun on Miguzi, and was later replaced with Ben 10 for the last slot before Miguzi was shut down in the same year. The final rerun of the show lasted from 2008 to 2009, and it was removed from the lineup in 2010.

Home media
In Region 1, Warner Home Video has released one compilation on DVD and VHS that contained the first six segment-episodes from season one, titled Heart of Lucha, on August 23, 2003. The direct-to-video movie The Return of El Maléfico, was released on October 5, 2004, exclusively at Walmart, while other retailers released it on January 4, 2005, during the third and final season.

In 2019, ¡Mucha Lucha! was available remastered for the first time in High Definition for home viewers and became available on demand through Amazon Prime.

In 2022, The show became available for streaming on HBO Max in Latin American countries, also using the High Definition remasters.

Merchandise
A toy line based on the show was released by Jakks Pacific in 2004. In this toy line included "Mix-a-Lot" action figures; these had removable body parts that could be placed on the bodies of other action figures in the series. "Signature Move" action figures were also put out, along with a toy wrestling ring. However, the second series of the toy line was canceled.

During the summer of 2003, DC Comics published a three-issue mini-series of comic books based on ¡Mucha Lucha! All three of the stories featured in these comic books were written by Eddie Mort, and have even been occasionally referenced in the TV series.

 El Rey, Come Home!
 It's All Buena!
 Limbo of the Lost Luchadores!

The show was licensed for a Game Boy Advance video game, Mascaritas of the Lost Code, in late 2003, and also a Sony PlayStation 2 video game, Mysterioso Grande, was slated for release, but was cancelled around 2004 as the creators could not find a publisher.

Proposed revival
In 2014, a revival called ¡Mucha Lucha! Para Siempre was proposed which would have centered on Rikochet, Buena Girl, and the Flea as teenagers.

See also
 Lucha libre (Mexican wrestling)
 El Santo
 Chicos de Barrio

References

External links
 
 

¡Mucha Lucha!
Lucha libre
2002 American television series debuts
2005 American television series endings
2000s American animated television series
American children's animated adventure television series
American children's animated comedy television series
American children's animated action television series
American children's animated sports television series
American flash animated television series
Warner Bros. Television Studios franchises
Television series by Warner Bros. Animation
Cartoon Network original programming
Kids' WB original shows
Television shows set in California
Television shows set in Mexico
The WB original programming
Television shows adapted into comics
Television shows adapted into video games
Animated television series about children
English-language television shows
Latino sitcoms
Hispanic and Latino American television
Spanish-language television programming in the United States
Hispanic and Latino American culture